Chung Jae-young (born May 2, 1977), better known by the stage names J and J.ae, is a Korean-American singer based in South Korea. She debuted in 1998 with the album, J: Gold.

Early life

J grew up in San Francisco, California, and later Springfield, Virginia, where she attended West Springfield High School. She was discovered when she won the local title in a regional Miss Korea beauty pageant in Washington, D.C.

Career

In 2002, J was invited to contribute her talent to the FIFA World Cup's official album. Her song "Gotta Get Love" was featured on The Official Album of the 2002 FIFA World Cup Korea/Japan Edition.

In 2007, she released a contemporary Christian album In My Lifetime. The album had a more R&B/hip-hop feel than her previous releases.

In 2012, J hosted Arirang TV's The Sensation, a music-focused series that introduced traditional Korean instruments, music, and dance through multiple venues including concerts, studio audience tapings, and award-winning documentaries geared towards a world-wide English-speaking audience.

Personal life

On September 14, 2013, J married a U.S. soldier who was based in South Korea. Following their marriage, the couple moved to the United States. They have one daughter, born on June 28, 2016.

Discography

Awards and nominations

References

External links 
 

1977 births
American musicians of Korean descent
Living people
South Korean women pop singers
South Korean rhythm and blues singers
South Korean female idols
21st-century South Korean singers
21st-century South Korean women singers